Michelle Ray Smith (born September 24, 1974) is an American soap opera actress and underwear model.

Career 
Smith has been featured in the Victoria’s Secret catalogue, and has been seen nationally in television commercials for Listerine, Noxzema, Oil of Olay, Dannon, and a well-known and recognized spot for Dentyne Ice.  She currently resides in Brooklyn, New York.

In August 2005, Smith was introduced as a contract player on the daytime soap opera Guiding Light. She played Ava Peralta, a newcomer to the fictional town of Springfield. She left the role in July 2008 after the birth of her son, Jake. In 2009, she had a supporting role on Law & Order: SVU in the episode "Snatched" where she played Liz Rinaldi. In 2010, she had a supporting role in the film Salt, starring Angelina Jolie, and played the female lead role alongside Robert Englund in the independent film Inkubus.

Personal life 
Smith became a mother to a son named Jake on July 8, 2008.

References 

1974 births
Living people
American female models
American soap opera actresses
Place of birth missing (living people)
21st-century American women